The tennis competitions at the 2019 Games of the Small States of Europe was held from 28 May to 1 June 2019 at the Slovenska Plaža Tennis Center, Montenegro.

Medal table

Medal events

Men's singles

Seeds

Women's singles

Seeds

Men's doubles

Women's doubles

Mixed doubles

References

2019
Games of the Small States of Europe
2019
2019 Games of the Small States of Europe